Panola is an unincorporated community and census-designated place in Sumter County, Alabama, United States. As of the 2010 census, its population was 144. Panola has a post office with ZIP code 35477. The community's name comes from the Choctaw word ponola, which means "cotton".

Demographics

As of the 2010 United States Census, there were 144 people living in the CDP. The racial makeup of the CDP was 97.9% Black and 2.1% White.

Education
Sumter County School District operates public schools, including Sumter Central High School.

North Sumter Junior High School was previously in operation near, but not in, the Panola CDP. The Sumter County school board voted to close the school in 2018.

Notable people
Bill Bruton (1925 – 1995), Major League Baseball center fielder who was the National League stolen base champion in 1953, 1954, and 1955
Boston Blackie (1943 – 1993), Chicago blues musician

References

Census-designated places in Sumter County, Alabama
Census-designated places in Alabama
Alabama placenames of Native American origin